LA-23 is a constituency of Azad Kashmir Legislative Assembly which is currently represented by the Shah Ghulam Qadir of Pakistan Muslim League (N). It covers the whole area of Neelum District of Azad Kashmir, Pakistan.

Election 2016

elections were held in this constituency on 21 July 2016.

Neelam District
Azad Kashmir Legislative Assembly constituencies